The Aqueduct of the Gier (French Aqueduc du Gier)  is an ancient Roman aqueduct probably constructed in the 1st century AD to provide water for Lugdunum (Lyon), in what is now eastern France. It is the longest and best preserved of four  Roman aqueducts that served the growing capital of the Roman province of Gallia Lugdunensis.

Following a sinuous path, at  the aqueduct of the Gier is the longest known of the Roman aqueducts. Its route has been retraced in detail, following the numerous remains. Leaving the uplands of the Massif du Pilat, department of the Loire, the aqueduct hugs the surface relief and crosses the department of the Rhone, passing through Mornant, Orliénas, Chaponost and Sainte-Foy-lès-Lyon to terminate at Lyon.

In its extent, it draws upon the whole repertory of Roman techniques of aqueduct building, taking a slope that averages 0.1%, or a meter every kilometer. Access for cleaning and repairs was through manholes at  distances. There are some thirty stretches in the open air. There are ten stretches raised on walls and  arches, which provide the most spectacular visible remains of the aqueduct (illustrations).

Four  inverted siphon tunnels cross the particularly deep and wide river valleys of the Durèze, the Garon, the Yzeron and the Trion on pipe bridges raised on high arches. In these, water filled a sunken tank tower (castellum) on the brim of a slope. The tank effected a transition between open channel flow and a lead pipeline. From the castellum water was carried, now pressurized, in a set of airtight lead pipes laid side by side, with soldered joints, down the valley slope, across a bridge spanning the river—whose piers and arches are the most notable remains of the system—and up the facing slope, to a tank slightly lower than the head tank, losing just a little hydraulic head in the process. The inverted siphons obviated the bridging of deep valleys with arcade upon arcade of arches, as at Pont du Gard, which marks the limit of such a system.

Date
The Gier aqueduct was built in a single great campaign, since no part of it could have served until it was completed; it must have taken years. The aqueduct of Giers was dated by Germain de Montauzon to the reign of Hadrian in the early 2nd century AD, but, as James Stephen Bromwich points out, its reticulated stonework (opus reticulatum) was characteristic of the later 1st century BC and the first half of the 1st century AD, rather than of later masonry. In addition he notes that a recently excavated public fountain on the hill of Fourvières, datable about 50 AD could not have been supplied with water until the Giers aqueduct was complete.

Gallery

Notes

External links 
In French:
 ARCHEOLYON: Les Aqueducs Romains de LYON | l' AQUEDUC  ROMAIN  du  GIER - extremely detailed information, including detailed topographic maps of the whole route.
 Lyon Historique: Tracé de l’aqueduc du Gier sur Google Earth (format kml) - Google Earth trace of the whole route.
 French Wikipedia: Aqueduc du Gier

Buildings and structures in Loire (department)
Buildings and structures in Rhône (department)
Roman aqueducts in France
Ruins in Auvergne-Rhône-Alpes